The Palace Shield is a cricket league based in Preston and surrounding districts in Lancashire, England.

It recently celebrated its centenary, and is continuing to expand in size and improve in quality.  There are 7 divisions in the main Saturday competition, 2 Sunday leagues, Twenty20 Competition and a thriving junior competition.

Current Test stars such as Andrew Flintoff and Simon Kerrigan began their careers in the Palace Shield, though it remains a competition for amateurs only. Teams such as Vernon Carus, Thornton Cleveleys, Fulwood & Broughton, Freckleton and Longridge have dominated in latter years, but an influx of new clubs such as Walton-le-Dale ensures that competition remains keen and standards of facilities and play continue to improve.

In 2011 Andrew Flintoff applied to once again play in the Palace Shield for his brother's club Penwortham.

The League has 40 registered clubs playing in its Senior and/or Junior Competitions.

External links
 Palace Shield website

English domestic cricket competitions